Aleksander Strandman  (7 October 1856 - 8 February 1933) was a Finnish politician. He was a member of the Senate of Finland.

Finnish politicians
Finnish senators
1856 births
1933 deaths